Eupithecia melanograpta is a moth in the  family Geometridae. It is found in Peru.

The wingspan is about 15 mm. The forewings are dingy grey with a slight luteous tinge, crossed by darker grey lines. The hindwings are dingy grey, with the base paler.

References

Moths described in 1907
melanograpta
Moths of South America